WMUB (88.5 FM) is a public radio station licensed to Miami University, in Oxford, Ohio, United States. It produced local programming for 59 years until March 1, 2009, when it became a part of Cincinnati Public Radio. The station serves southwest Ohio and southeast Indiana. WMUB started as a student-operated station in the 1940s and turned FM in 1950. Once known for its “Rhythm and News”, it is now a full-time satellite of WVXU in Cincinnati. It primarily serves areas north of Cincinnati where the main WVXU signal is weak.

The station operates via a 24,500-watt transmitter located on Taylor Road in Butler County. WMUB broadcasts in the HD Radio format.

Prior to becoming a Cincinnati Public Radio repeater, WMUB was historically a resource to enable Miami University students studying broadcasting and journalism to train in reporting and on-air delivery. WMUB listeners also tuned in on weekday nights to listen to the voice of Mama Jazz, Phyllis Campbell, who hosted an evening show, broadcast from 8 to 11 pm.

In January 2007, the University President, David C. Hodge, charged a committee to explore alternatives to address budgetary and technological challenges for WMUB. The university owns the radio station’s license and covered nearly 62 percent of its $1.7 million budget. The committee released its report in fall 2007 and strongly recommended pursuing and developing regional connections with other existing non-commercial stations and building on connections with appropriate academic programs within the university.

In January 2009, the university announced that it was turning operation of the station over to Cincinnati Public Radio effective March 1, 2009. Seven people lost their jobs because of this change.

See also
Williams Hall (Miami University)

References

External links
 
 WMUB Archives. Maintained by the Walter Havighurst Special Collections, Miami University Libraries.

MUB
NPR member stations
Miami University
1940 establishments in Ohio